Secret Mountain Fort Awesome is an American animated television series created by Peter Browngardt for Cartoon Network that debuted in 2011. The show revolves around a fraternity of five monsters who unleash wild stunts upon the public from their eponymous underground mountain fort.

The series is loosely based on the antagonists that appeared in Browngardt's animated short, Uncle Grandpa, and employs Mike Conte of the heavy metal band Early Man as composer. The show's raunchy, surrealist humor was heavily indebt to the underground comix scene, and drew a mixed to negative reception, though it received praise for its art direction.

The show premiered as a sneak peek on August 1, 2011, and had a formal premiere on September 26, 2011. Designers Robertryan Cory and Chris Tsirgiotis both won awards for "Outstanding Individual in Animation" at the 64th Primetime Emmy Awards ceremony.  The Uncle Grandpa short that Browngardt had produced was eventually adapted as a full series of the same name, which he felt was a more lighthearted adaptation for children.

The series last aired on television on February 17, 2012, with the remaining episodes being released on iTunes from March 8 to 29, 2012.

Plot

A race of monsters known as the Disgustoids are banished from society due to their unruly behavior and grotesque appearances.
From their sentient and eponymous subterranean mountain fort, they unleash crazy stunts on the public.
Their leader, a purple tusked creature depicted wearing a pair of underwear named Festro (voiced by Peter Browngardt), is a macho party animal willing to do anything to help out his group, even when his help is less than desired, Festro always.
Dingle (also voiced by Browngardt), a scrawny, blue dog-like monster, who acts as their faithful pet, intelligible only to the group.
Slog (voiced by Steve Little), a furred proboscis monkey-like monster, is likewise blindly loyal, but lacks critical judgement skills—the more hazardous something is, the more likely he will be to follow it.
Gweelok (voiced by Paul Rugg), an acned ball of mucus, has a demanding attitude and an obsession with technology.
The Fart (voiced by Pat Duke), a giant monster made of buttocks who flatulates when touched—is the most sensitive and levelheaded of the group.

Production
At their 2011 upfront, Cartoon Network announced Secret Mountain Fort Awesome, along with various other series. Billed as a comedy, the show was created by Peter Browngardt and based on his animated short Uncle Grandpa, which garnered praise, a cult following and an Emmy Award nomination.
Both were produced at Cartoon Network Studios. Before landing his own show, Browngardt had worked at Augenblick Studios and MTV, as well as on individual programs, such as Futurama, The Venture Bros. The Marvelous Misadventures of Flapjack and Chowder. Browngardt's work on the lattermost series began when its creator C.H. Greenblatt looked through one of his pitch bibles that he left at the studio.

The show borrows elements and its design style from his Uncle Grandpa short, which was pitched to the network as a pilot. According to Browngardt, Cartoon Network executives were unsure about having a series centered on the title character, and felt the monster characters from the pilot had more potential. Character designer Robertryan Cory and David P. Smith (a director and storyboard artist on Dexter's Laboratory and The Powerpuff Girls) were brought on board to help shape the project's development, the series was animated by the Chinese animation studios Hong Ying & Sichuan Top Animation Company.

In an interview with Cartoon Brew, Browngardt called the process of pitching his pilot an "amazing learning experience" because it allowed him to propose an idea to the network and see "how it can manipulate and change while you're working on it". On the show, animation veteran Chris Reccardi served as creative director, whilst Sue Mondt (who had previously art directed Cartoon Network's Camp Lazlo) handled art direction and Robert Alvarez with Larry Leichliter directed the animation. Browngardt depicted the production schedule as "really tight", which called for them to manage their time and to pick their battles with the network.

Referring to his encounters with the network regarding content, Browngardt learned to let go and find the "right balance", as well as to ask himself, "Is my grandma going to notice this?" For the music, Mike Conte of the heavy metal band Early Man was employed as composer. The score, which incorporates heavy metal elements and "lots of riffage", was originally added to the animatics as a rough draft. Browngardt found that it harmonized with the imagery and what he envisioned for the design. Conte noted Browngardt's inspirations from Garbage Pail Kids and Don Martin of Mad magazine, but called the result "definitely its own thing".

Voice cast

 Peter Browngardt
 Pat Duke
 Steve Little
 Paul Rugg
 Clive Revill
 Grey DeLisle
 Pat Fraley
 Tom Kenny
 Donald Gibb
 Heather Halley
 Andy Merrill
 David P. Smith
 Dee Bradley Baker
 Mark Bodnar
 Dee Snider
 Kath Soucie
 Steve Blum
 Brook Chalmers
 Valery Pappas
 Clancy Brown

Broadcast and reception
Secret Mountain premiered on August 1, 2011, on Cartoon Network as part of a sneak preview; this broadcast was seen by 1.8 million viewers. It premiered formally on September 26 as part of their Monday night programming block, where it was seen by 1.3 million viewers, marking a slight decrease from the previous broadcast. The show was moved to Fridays upon its second-season premiere on December 30, 2011. Following the premiere of the eighth episode of the season on February 17, 2012, the show was pulled from broadcast. The network released the remaining eight episodes through iTunes a month later, from March 8 to March 29, thus concluding the show.

The series was panned by critics. 
Many critics were complimentary in regards to the series' art style. In his website Lineboil, Aaron Simpson compared it to Garbage Pail Kids and the works of Don Martin, two elements of his childhood. Amid Amidi of Cartoon Brew called Robertryan Cory's character designs "impressive" and "distinctively styled", though he felt the art style's complexity made the limited animation quality suffer as a result. Abby Koenig of Houston Press compared its "ridiculous" nature to the film Little Monsters, and proposed that Howie Mandel (featured in the latter work) guest voice a monster on the show. Shannon O'Leary of Publishers Weekly wrote that the show, along with others on the network such as Adventure Time and Superjail!, bore resemblance to the aesthetics of established independent comics artists. Meanwhile, Jason Krell of io9 considered it a failure despite its influences from Adventure Time, which made way for many successful original series on the network.

The episode "Nightmare Sauce" received multiple accolades, including at the 2012 Annecy International Animated Film Festival for "Best TV Production" (of which Browngardt was the recipient), and at the 64th Primetime Emmy Awards, where Cory and Chris Tsirgiotis were awarded "Outstanding Individual in Animation". Cory also won at the 39th Annie Awards for "Character Design in a Television Production", while Tsirgiotis, Sue Mondt, Daniel Elson and Mark Bodnar were collectively awarded "Production Design in a Television Production". At the 40th Annie Awards, Thaddeus Paul Couldron was nominated for "Character Design in an Animated Television or Other Broadcast Venue Production" for his work on the episode "Secret Mountain Uncle Grandpa".

Series overview

Episodes

Season 1 (2011)

Season 2 (2011–12)

Spin-off

After Secret Mountain Fort Awesome got panned by critics, The Cartoonstitute original Uncle Grandpa short that Browngardt produced was adapted as a full series of the same name. A preview was shown as part of Cartoon Network's shorts development initiative. The series revolves around the title character, who is simultaneously the grandfather and uncle of everyone in the world. Browngardt explained that while the new series would retain some aspects of Secret Mountain, it would be a more lighthearted adaption for children. He ultimately expressed that he wanted "more variety in the music and be able to go  sort of a happier place, though it does go dark and heavy at times".

References

Works cited

External links
 
 

2010s American animated television series
2011 American television series debuts
2012 American television series endings
American children's animated comedy television series
Animated television series about monsters
Cartoon Network original programming
Cartoon Network franchises
Television series by Cartoon Network Studios
English-language television shows
Heavy metal television series
Television series created by Peter Browngardt
Uncle Grandpa
Annie Award winners